Erjie is a railway station on the Taiwan Railways Administration (TRA) Yilan line located in Wujie Township, Yilan County, Taiwan.

History
The station was opened on 24 March 1919.

Around the station
 Erjie Rice Barn

See also
 List of railway stations in Taiwan

References

1919 establishments in Taiwan
Railway stations in Yilan County, Taiwan
Railway stations opened in 1919
Railway stations served by Taiwan Railways Administration